Hipódromo da Gávea is a racecourse used for horse racing, located in the Gávea neighborhood in Rio de Janeiro, Brazil. Built in  1926, it has 3,000 seats and an overall capacity of 80,000.

References

External links 
 Jockey Club Brasileiro (in Portuguese) http://www.jcb.com.br/historia/

Horse racing venues in Brazil
Sports venues in Rio de Janeiro (city)